Caroline Auguste Fischer (maiden name Venturini, married name Christiani, born 9 August 1764 in Braunschweig – died 26 May 1842 in Frankfurt) was a German writer and women's rights activist.

Life
On her father's side, Caroline Auguste Venturini's family was probably of Italian origin. Her father Karl Venturini (1735–1801) was a chamber musician at the ducal court in Braunschweig and her mother Charlotty, whose maiden name was Köchy, was the daughter of a tailor. Her brother Karl Heinrich Georg Venturini was a famous early-19th-century theologist and writer. Her other three siblings died young. 

In her first marriage, she was married to the Pastor Cristoph Johann Rudolph Christiani (1761–1841), at the latest from the year 1791. From 1793, Christiani was the German high priest in Copenhagen and ran a boys' school there, at which her brother Karl taught for several years. The jurist and politician Rudolf Christiani (1797–1858) was their son. A daughter of theirs, who was born as early as 1792, died at the age of three in 1795. During her time in Copenhagen, she rubbed shoulders with Danish and German artists. Among others, she was friendly with the writer Jens Immanuel Baggesen.
In the year 1801, she was deemed the guilty party in her divorce from Christiani and therefore had to leave her son in her father's custody. Caroline Auguste Christiani, who was also called Caroline Auguste Ferdinande Christiani, thereupon went to Dresden. In the same year, she began to write and thereby soon became famous. At this time, she was already living together with the businessman and writer Christian August Fischer, who had been a professor in Würzburg since 1804 and with whom she had a son, Albert, in 1803. They lived separately, but ended up marrying in 1808 after all, probably so that their son would be considered legitimate. They divorced again after just 7 months of marriage in 1809. He himself admitted to having been put off by her advanced age and overwhelmed by her fame. 

Even though Christian Fischer had to pay alimony as the guilty party in the divorce, Caroline Auguste Fischer got into financial difficulty. Having published her first novels as early as 1801, she worked as a writer and, in 1816; her divorced husband was dismissed from the university and subsequently discontinued the alimony payments, meaning that she would have less and less time to dedicate to her writing. Up until 1820, she was still writing stories and newspaper articles, after which year she made a living as the principal of a reform school in Heidelberg and as a library book dealer in Frankfurt. In her later years, she suffered from melancholy, which is why she was admitted to a care home for several weeks in 1832. She subsequently moved to Frankfurt to live with her son. After Albert's death two years later, nothing more is known about her. Completely impoverished, she died in the Frankfurt Hospice of the Holy Spirit in 1842.

Work
After her divorce, Caroline Auguste Christiani began to write. In her work, which was probably also influenced by her own life, she depicted the tension between the genders, juxtaposing traditional female role models with new, alternative ways for women to live their lives, which mostly completely contradicted the idealistic view of the woman in the early 19th century.  In line with her call for equality, which only existed for men in the French Revolution, she called for women's right to an independent way of life, which could also absolutely still be traditional marriage.
Her debut novel Gustav's Aberrations was published anonymously. She narrated the story from the perspective of the male protagonist, detailing his feelings towards different women in his life. He repeatedly idealises them and is then repulsed when he discovers a real, independent person instead of his ideal. Gustav ashamedly recognises the societal gap between the genders. Chastened and suffering from a sexually transmitted disease he returns to his first true love. However, he then wants to get divorced because the ideal of their marriage cannot be fulfilled: they do not have any children and, as a consequence, he believes he will make his wife unhappy. Like the previous wives, the wife and her wishes are not part of his imagination. The book ends with Gustav's premature death and his widow's second marriage, which produces many children. 

Her epistolary novel The Honeymonths, which was written not long after her divorce, is a response to Wilhelmine Karoline von Wobeser's publication Elisa, or the wife as she should be, which was a bestseller at its time, and in which von Wobeser creates the ideal image of the selfless woman. In 1800, Caroline Auguste's partner Fischer had written an appendix for the fifth edition in which he outlined man's right to supremacy and demanded subservience from women. Caroline Auguste Christiani's The Honeymonths was released anonymously. The female protagonist, the virtuous and gentle Julie, is, like in Elisa, trapped in an unhappy marriage of convenience and actually willingly sacrifices herself for her selfish husband, who is described as unlikeable, instead of choosing to love another man. In contrast, her friend Wilhelmine repudiates the contemporary image of women, refuses an arranged marriage and instead demands a temporary marriage and women's right to keep their children after a divorce. She urges Julie to take a stand and warns her not to become like Elisa. Julie ends up remaining a widow, whereas Wilhelmine finds her love.

In The Protégé Fischer addresses the question of how women deal with power and how men deal with powerful women. The protagonist, the ruler Iwanova, resembles Catherine the Great. She is pitted against young Maria, the embodiment of the ideal woman in Rousseau's sense. Both women are connected to Prince Alexander from whose perspective the story unfolds. The prince rejects the ruler's love for two reasons: at first, he deems his career more important and later on he recognises the selfless love of Maria. Iwanova allows their marriage, but she murders the couple during their wedding night. Nevertheless, Iwanova is depicted positively, while Alexander is the one who does not get along with a strong woman.

In the novel Margaret, two women opt against marriage. Rosamunde, who is a dancer, would prefer to dedicate her time for art and Margaret decides against the love of a prince and the upward mobility that would have come with the relationship. Instead, she dedicates herself to social work..

In her short story William the Negro, published in 1817, the protagonist is a black man. William, a freed slave living under the protection of Sir Robert, a rich Englishman, falls in love with Molly who is the daughter of an impoverished businessman. However, their love story fails, which has less to do with the prejudices from Molly's relatives than with Robert who actually wants to serve his friend as messenger of love but himself falls in love with Molly. William leaves Molly and becomes one of the leaders of the Haitian Revolution, turning the French colony Saint-Domingue into Haiti, the first state governed by black people. Although Fischer does not completely discard contemporary racism, she does clearly speak out against slavery and argues in favour of human rights for all people. 

Caroline Fischer published a few narratives in magazines between 1816 and 1820, but then stopped. Carl Wilhelm Otto August von Schindel wrote in his 1825 book German Female Writers of the 19th Century: "Rather than those of other people, she has been gathering her own thoughts about women for eighteen years now in order to put them together in a book. Considering her circumstances she has not been able to determine when and if the book will be released." 
It was never published.

Publications
 Gustavs Verirrungen. Novel, 1801
 Vierzehn Tage in Paris. Fairy Tale, 1801
 Mährchen. In: Journal der Romane. St. 10. Berlin, 1802 (digital copy and full text in the German text archive)
 Krauskopf und Goldlöckchen. Fairy Tale, 1802
 Selim und Zoraïde. Fairy Tale, 1802
 Paridamia oder die Krebsscheeren. Fairy Tale, 1802
 Die Honigmonathe. Two Volumes. 1802 and 1804
 Der Günstling. 1809
 Margarethe. Novel, 1812
 Kleine Erzählungen und romantische Skizzen. 1819 (Content: Riekchen, William der Neger, Mathilde, Saphir and Marioh and Justin'')

Literature
 Lexikon deutschsprachiger Schriftstellerinnen 1800–1945. Munich: dtv, 1986. (S. 85 f.) – Statement says: „† 1834 in Frankfurt am Main“.
 Manfred R. W. Garzmann, Wolf-Dieter Schuegraf, Norman-Mathias Pingel: Braunschweiger Stadtlexikon. Ergänzungsband. Meyer, Brunswick 1996, .
 Horst-Rüdiger Jarck, Günter Scheel (Hrsg.): Braunschweigisches Biographisches Lexikon. 19. und 20. Jahrhundert. Hahn, Hanover 1996, .
 Clementine Kügler: Caroline Auguste Fischer (1764–1842). Eine Werkbiographie. Diss. FU Berlin 1989.
 Elke Spitzer: Emanzipationsansprüche zwischen der Querelle des Femmes und der modernen Frauenbewegung: der Wandel des Gleichheitsbegriffs am Ausgang des 18. Jahrhunderts. Diss., Kassel Univ. Press, 2002, S. 123–163, Full text (PDF; 882 kB).
Christine Touaillon: Der deutsche Frauenroman des 18. Jahrhunderts. Braumüller, Vienna and Leipzig 1919, S. 578–629 – Internet Archive.

References

External links

 
 
 
 Märchen bei LibriVox

German women writers
German-language writers
1764 births 
1842 deaths